KPPO (90.5 FM) is a non-commercial radio station licensed to serve the community of Mapusaga, a village on Tutuila island in the American territory of American Samoa. The station's broadcast license, issued in December 2011, is held by the Second Samoan Congregational Church of Long Beach. KPPO broadcasts a religious radio format.

History
In October 2007, the Second Samoan Congregational Church of Long Beach applied to the Federal Communications Commission (FCC) for a construction permit for a new broadcast radio station. The U.S. Federal Communications Commission granted this permit on January 12, 2009, with a scheduled expiration date of January 12, 2012. The new station was assigned call sign "KPPO" on May 12, 2009. After construction and testing were completed in December 2011, the station was granted its broadcast license on December 7, 2011.

References

External links
Second Samoan Church of Long Beach, California

Tutuila
Radio stations established in 2011
PPO
2011 establishments in American Samoa